Naoma is an unincorporated community in Raleigh County, West Virginia, United States. Naoma has a post office with ZIP code 25140.

The community was named after Naoma Pettry.

References

Unincorporated communities in Raleigh County, West Virginia
Unincorporated communities in West Virginia